is a Japanese astronomer and co-discoverer of asteroids. The Minor Planet Center credits him with the discovery of 52 minor planets he made at the Kani Observatory between 1989 and 1993.

The inner main-belt asteroid 4541 Mizuno, discovered by his college Toshimasa Furuta,  was named in his honor on 5 March 1996.

List of discovered minor planets

References 
 

1954 births
Discoverers of asteroids

20th-century Japanese astronomers
Living people